San Francisco Zapotitlán is a town, with a population of 18,468 (2018 census), and a municipality in the Suchitepéquez department of Guatemala.

References 

Municipalities of the Suchitepéquez Department